Angus Oblong (born David Adam Walker; August 28, 1976) is an American writer and illustrator best known for his work Creepy Susie and 13 Other Tragic Tales for Troubled Children (1999) and the 2001 animated television series The Oblongs. The character Milo—which appeared in his Creepy Susie book—was based on a young version of himself; the Milo that appeared on the television show The Oblongs was a less exaggerated version of the character from the book.

Oblong had favorite cartoons before he began animating, such as Looney Tunes, Animaniacs, Freakazoid!, and Earthworm Jim. He was also influenced by distorted characters from the Dick and Jane books, Brothers Grimm fairy tales, and some real life oddities in Ripley's Believe It or Not!.

Early years
Oblong was born David Adam Walker on August 28, 1976, in Sacramento, California, to Elizabeth (née Angus), a preschool teacher, and Dr. Robert David Walker, MD, a surgeon. and attended the University of California, Berkeley for a couple of years.  He moved to Los Angeles, California, at the request of his agent when a "bidding war" was underway over whether Fox, The WB, or Disney would produce what became The Oblongs.

When his work began garnering attention from the press, Oblong began wearing "thick clown makeup and a bulbous, red plastic nose" in public places and by now was referring to himself as "Angus Oblong" (namesake of a shape of the rectangle and his mother's former last name), a practice he has continued into 2010, when LA Weekly named him one of the L.A. People 2009.

Books 
Oblong's book, Creepy Susie and 13 Other Tragic Tales for Troubled Children, consists of 13 short stories of adult-oriented humor.  Many of the characters from his animated TV series The Oblongs first appear in this book, including Milo and Creepy Susie.  A self-published sequel, 13 More Tragic Tales for Ugly Children, is available from his website.

He has also self-published three collections of drawings: Angus Oblong Random Drawings Book One, Book Two and Book Three.

Television
His animated television series, The Oblongs, airing originally on The WB and in syndication on Adult Swim. The WB picked it up at the end of the day. The complete series was released on DVD.

Oblong wrote, directed, and produced Deliriously Jen, a television pilot that aired on Comedy Central and was shown at several film festivals in 2005.

Theater
The Victorian Hotel, a play written by Oblong, and created in association with Rogue Artists Ensemble, featuring many of his characters as puppets, played October through December 2006 at the Powerhouse Theatre in Santa Monica, California.
In 2018, The Victorian Hotel traveled to Seattle.

See also
Charles Addams
Robert Crumb
Edward Gorey
Lorin Morgan-Richards
Marvin Townsend
Gahan Wilson

References

External links
Oblong's personal website

Alter egos
American illustrators
American short story writers
American surrealist artists
Television producers from California
1976 births
Living people
Artists from Sacramento, California
Pseudonymous artists